Agni Pareeksha is a 1968 Indian Malayalam-language film, directed by M. Krishnan Nair and produced by M. Krishnan Nair. The film stars Prem Nazir, Sathyan, Sheela and Sharada.

Cast

Prem Nazir as Ramesh
Sathyan as Dr. Mohan
Sheela as Hema
Sharada as Hemalatha
Adoor Bhasi as Unni
Pattom Sadan as Manoharan
T. R. Omana as Shankari
T. S. Muthaiah as Raghavan
Aranmula Ponnamma as Dr. Mohan's Mother
C. A. Balan
G. K. Pillai as Krishna Kurup
K. P. Ummer as Gopal
Panjabi
Sree Subha as Sumathi

Soundtrack
The music was composed by G. Devarajan and the lyrics were written by Vayalar Ramavarma.

References

External links
 

1968 films
1960s Malayalam-language films
Films directed by M. Krishnan Nair